Mimoun Mahi (born 13 March 1994) is a professional footballer who plays as a winger for Cambuur in the Eredivisie, on loan from Utrecht. He formerly played for FC Groningen and FC Zürich. Born in the Netherlands, he represents Morocco at international level.

Club career
Mahi helped FC Groningen win the KNVB Cup in 2014–15 against defending champions PEC Zwolle. It was their first major trophy and they qualified for the UEFA Europa League.

In February 2019, Swiss Super League side FC Zürich announced Mahi would join the club from FC Groningen in summer 2019 having agreed a three-year contract.

After one year in Switzerland, Mahi returned to the Netherlands, where he signed a four-year contract with FC Utrecht.

On 17 January 2023, Mahi joined Cambuur on loan for the rest of the season.

International career
Mahi was born in The Hague to parents of Moroccan descent. He has represented the Royal Dutch Football Association at various youth levels.

Mahi made his debut for the Morocco national team in a 6–0 2018 FIFA World Cup qualification win over Mali on 1 September 2017, wherein he also scored his debut goal.

Career statistics

Club

International
Scores and results list Morocco's goal tally first, score column indicates score after each Mahi goal.

Honours
Groningen
KNVB Cup: 2014–15

References

External links
 
 
 Voetbal International profile 
 

1994 births
Living people
Footballers from The Hague
Association football wingers
Moroccan footballers
Morocco international footballers
Dutch footballers
Netherlands under-21 international footballers
Netherlands youth international footballers
Dutch sportspeople of Moroccan descent
Eredivisie players
Eerste Divisie players
Derde Divisie players
Swiss Super League players
Sparta Rotterdam players
FC Groningen players
FC Zürich players
FC Utrecht players
SC Cambuur players
Dutch expatriate footballers
Moroccan expatriate footballers
Dutch expatriate sportspeople in Switzerland
Moroccan expatriate sportspeople in Switzerland
Expatriate footballers in Switzerland